"Gettin' It Together" is a song by former professional skateboarder and Quannum Projects-member Tommy Guerrero, released March 22, 2004 on the independent label Galaxia Records. The song was originally recorded for Guerrero's third studio album Soul Food Taqueria (2003), and features rapper Lyrics Born contributing vocals. It was released as a limited edition 12" vinyl single with the instrumental version as the b-side and a previously unreleased recording. The cover art for the single was designed by artist Stephen (ESPO) Powers, also the designer of the cover artwork for Soul Food Taqueria.

Track listing
12" vinyl (ltd. edition)

"Gettin' It Together"
"Gettin' It Together" (Instrumental)
"Good Times a Comin'"

Personnel

Credits adapted from album sleeve liner notes.

Notes

References

External links
Soul Food Taqueria at Rhapsody

2003 songs
2004 singles